Milan Arežina (born 1 May 1960) is a Yugoslav rower. He competed in the men's quadruple sculls event at the 1980 Summer Olympics.

References

External links
 * 

1960 births
Living people
Yugoslav male rowers
Olympic rowers of Yugoslavia
Rowers at the 1980 Summer Olympics
Place of birth missing (living people)